The Strachan House Garage, at 414-1/2 Butler Ave. on St. Simons Island in Glynn County, Georgia, is a two-story garage and residence which was built  circa 1925.  It was listed on the National Register of Historic Places in 1997.  The listing included two contributing buildings.

It was originally part of a resort estate which no longer exists.  Its first story is brick and its second story is wood.  It was converted to residential-only in 1978 and was renovated further in 1987.

References

Houses on the National Register of Historic Places in Georgia (U.S. state)
Late 19th and Early 20th Century American Movements architecture
Houses completed in 1925
National Register of Historic Places in Glynn County, Georgia
Houses in Glynn County, Georgia
St. Simons, Georgia